Ron A. Brenneman (born 1946) was the president and chief executive officer of Petro-Canada. He has been a director at the company since 2000.  His annual compensation for 2005 was $2.68 million CAD. Prior to joining Petro-Canada, he was also a director at Scotiabank and Bell Canada Enterprises. He graduated from the University of Toronto in 1968 with a degree in chemical engineering. He also received a Master of Science degree from the University of Manchester and completed the Senior Executive program at the MIT Sloan School of Management.

References

Living people
Canadian chief executives
Petroleum industry in Canada
University of Toronto alumni
Alumni of the University of Manchester
MIT Sloan School of Management alumni
1947 births
Canadian corporate directors
Directors of Scotiabank
Petro-Canada people